Ingólfur Arnarsson is an Icelandic artist born in 1956.

Arnarsson's drawings are characterized by delicate lines, precision and time. He has also painted on concrete.

His work can be found in the following collections: 

 National Gallery of Iceland, Reykjavik, Iceland
 Reykjavik Municipal Art Museum, Reykjavik, Iceland
 Living Art Museum, Reykjavik, Iceland
 Hafnarborg, The Hafnarfjordur Centre of Culture and Fine Art, Iceland
 Art Museum of Isafjordur, Iceland
 Museum Moderner Kunst, Landkreis Cuxhaven, Germany
 Abteiberg Museum, Mönchengladbach, Germany
 Chinati Foundation, Marfa, Texas, USA
 Kunstmuseum Bonn, Germany
 Maxine and Stuart Frankel Foundation for Art, Michigan, USA
 Safn, Reykjavík, Iceland

References

Living people
1956 births
Ingolfur Arnarsson